Pradoxa urdambideli is a species of sea snail, a marine gastropod mollusc in the family Muricidae, the dove snails.

Description
The length of the shell attains 3.3 mm.

Distribution
The species occurs off the island of São Tomé, São Tomé and Príncipe.

References

External links
 Houart, R. & Rolán, E. (2012). The genus Pradoxa Fernandes & Rolán, 1993 (Gastropoda: Muricidae) in São Tomé, Príncipe and Annobón. Iberus. 30(1): 1-14

Muricidae
Endemic fauna of São Tomé Island
Invertebrates of São Tomé and Príncipe
Gastropods described in 2012